The 1990 Basque Pelota World Championships were the 11th edition of the Basque Pelota World Championships organized by  the FIPV.

Participating nations

Others

Events
A total of 13 events were disputed, in 4 playing areas.

Trinquete, 5 events disputed

Fronton (30 m), 3 events disputed

Fronton (36 m), 4 events disputed

Fronton (54 m), 1 event disputed

Medal table

References

World Championships,1990
1990 in sports
Sport in Havana
International sports competitions hosted by Cuba
1990 in Cuban sport
World Championships,1990
World Championships